Citizens Building may refer to:

Citizens Building (Cleveland, Ohio)
Citizens Building (Columbus, Ohio)

Buildings and structures disambiguation pages